Goal of the Year may refer to:

 Goal of the Year (Australia), Australian Football League (Australian rules football), first awarded in 1970
 Goal of the Year (Germany), Bundesliga (football), selected by ARD German TV, first awarded in 1971
 MLS Goal of the Year Award, Major League Soccer, first awarded in 1996

See also

Goal of the Month (disambiguation)
Goal of the Season (disambiguation)
Goal of the Decade
Goal of the century
Mark of the Year
FIFA Puskás Award